Yevhen Olehovych Martynenko (born 25 June 1993) is a Ukrainian professional footballer who plays as a centre-back for Norwegian club Fana.

Career

Early years
Martynenko is a product of Chornomorets Odesa academy.

Chornomorets Odesa
He made his debut for Chornomorets in the game against Hoverla Uzhhorod on 11 May 2014 in the Ukrainian Premier League.

Vorskla Poltava
On 23 June 2018 he moved to Ukrainian Premier League club Vorskla Poltava.

Return to Chornomorets Odesa
In September 2020 Martynenko returned to Chornomorets Odesa.

References

External links
 
 

1993 births
Living people
Footballers from Odesa
Ukrainian footballers
Association football defenders
FC Chornomorets Odesa players
FC Chornomorets-2 Odesa players
FC Vorskla Poltava players
Fana IL players
Ukrainian Premier League players
Ukrainian expatriate footballers
Expatriate footballers in Norway
Ukrainian expatriate sportspeople in Norway